Ocean of Confusion is the third 'best of' album by the Screaming Trees. The album chronicles their career from the time they signed to Epic Records until their final album, Dust. The band's years on SST Records are represented on a separate, earlier-released compilation, Anthology: SST Years 1985-1989. The tracks on Ocean of Confusion were personally chosen by the band's lead vocalist, Mark Lanegan, and all other aspects of the compilation were overseen by Lanegan, as well. 

"Who Lies in Darkness" is taken from the Something About Today EP, along with three tracks from Uncle Anesthesia, seven from Sweet Oblivion, and five from Dust. "E.S.K.", a b-side to the "Nearly Lost You" single , is also collected, as well as two previously unheard songs from the aborted Don Fleming-produced follow up to Sweet Oblivion.

Notably, the album does not include "Bed of Roses" (Uncle Anesthesia) and "All I Know" (Dust), which were two of the band's four charting radio-play singles.

Track listing
 "Who Lies in Darkness" – 4:14
 "Alice Said" – 4:11
 "Disappearing" – 3:11
 "Ocean of Confusion" – 3:05
 "Shadow of the Season" – 4:34
 "Nearly Lost You" – 4:07
 "Dollar Bill" – 4:34
 "More or Less" – 3:10
 "For Celebrations Past" – 4:09
 "Julie Paradise" – 5:01
 "Butterfly" – 3:22
 "E.S.K." – 4:10
 "Watchpocket Blues" (previously unreleased) – 5:14
 "Paperback Bible" (previously unreleased) – 3:07
 "Make My Mind" – 4:12
 "Dying Days" – 4:51
 "Sworn and Broken" – 3:34
 "Witness" – 3:39
 "Traveler" – 5:22

Personnel 
Mark Lanegan - Vocals, selection
Gary Lee Conner - Guitar, Backing Vocals
Van Conner - Bass, Backing Vocals
Barrett Martin - Drums, Percussion 
Mark Pickerel - Drums, Percussion
Charles Peterson - Photography
Howie Weinberg - Mastering
Josh Cheuse - Art direction
Ross Halfin - Photography
Danny Clinch - Photography
Jeff McGraph - Trumpet
Jonas G. - Mixing
Michael Azerrad - Liner notes
Darren Salmieri - A&R
Mark Unterberger - Packaging manager
Lisa Buckler - Product manager
21st Street Singers - Vocals (background)
Brian Klein - Project manager
Milori - Cello
John Agnello - Engineer
Benmont Tench - Organ, mellotron, piano, piano (electric)
Chris Cornell - Vocals (background), producer
Mike McCready - Guitar
Terry Date - Producer
George Drakoulias - Percussion, producer
Don Fleming - Producer
Chris Goss - Vocals (background)
Brian Jenkins - Vocals (background)

References

Screaming Trees albums
2005 greatest hits albums
Albums produced by George Drakoulias
Grunge compilation albums
Epic Records compilation albums